This is a list of communities in the Canadian province of Nova Scotia, as designated by the Union of Nova Scotia Municipalities. For the purposes of this list, a community is defined as an unincorporated settlement inside or outside a municipality.

Regional municipalities  
Nova Scotia has four regional municipalities.

Towns  
Nova Scotia has 27 towns.

Municipal districts  
Nova Scotia has 12 municipal districts.

Villages  

Nova Scotia has 21 villages.

Other communities 

A
Abbots Dyke
Acaciaville
Acacia Valley
Advocate Harbour
Africville
Afton
Aldershot
Argyle Sound
Arichat
Arisaig
Arlington
Aspen
Atlanta
Atlantic
Atwoods Brook
Aylesford
Auburn

B
Baccaro
Bald Rock
Bangor
Barrachois (Cape Breton County)
Barrachois (Colchester County)
Barrington
Barrington Passage
Barrington West
Bass River
Baxters Harbour
Bayport
Bayside
Bay St. Lawrence
Bear Cove (Digby)
Bear Cove (Halifax)
Bear Point
Bear River
Beaver Dam
Bedford
Benacadie
Ben Eoin
Beinn Bhreagh
Beinn Scalpie
Big Beach
Big Pond
Big Pond Centre
Billtown
Birchtown
Black Rock, Colchester County
Black Rock, Cumberland County
Black Rock, Kings County
Black Rock, Victoria County
Blanche
Blomidon
Borneo
Bramber
Brass Hill
Brighton
Brookfield
Brooklyn (Hants)
Brooklyn (Queens)
Brook Village
Bucklaw

C
Caledonia
Cambridge (Hants County)
Cambridge (Kings County)
Campbell
Canaan (Kings County)
Canaan (Lunenburg County)
Canaan (Yarmouth County)
Canso
Cape North
Capstick
Cannes
Canning Aboteau
Carleton Village
Castle Bay
Central Woods Harbour
Centre Burlington
Centreville (Shelburne County)
Charlesville
Chéticamp
Chéverie
Cherry Brook
Chipmans Corner
Chester
Christmas Island
Church Point
Churchover
Clam Point
Clarksville
Clementsport
Cleveland
Clementsvale
Clyde River
Cole Harbour
Coldbrook
Coffinscroft
Collingwood
Conquerall Mills
Conway
Cornwallis Park
Country Harbour
Creignish

D
Dartmouth
Debert
Deep Brook
Digby
Dingwall
Doctors Cove
Dominion
Donkin
Duncan's Cove

E
Economy
East Baccaro
East Bay
East Berlin
East LaHave
East Pennant
East Preston
Ecum Secum
Eel Bay
Ellershouse
Elmsdale
Elmsvale
Enfield

F
Fairview
Falmouth
Fall River
Fauxburg
Five Islands
Florence
Forbes Point
Forest Glen
Frenchvale

G
Gardner Mines
Gardner's Mill
Gavelton
Glace Bay
Glen Haven
Goshen
Grand Desert, Nova Scotia
Grand Étang
Grand Pré
Granville Ferry
Great Village
Greenville
Greenwood (Shelburne County)
Greenwood
Grosses Coques
Guinea
Gunning Cove
Guysborough

H
Habitant
Halibut Bay
Halls Harbour
Hammonds Plains
Harrietsfield
Harrigan Cove
Harpellville
Havre Boucher
Hebron
Hebb's Cross
Hectanooga
Herring Cove
Hilden
Hilliton
Hillgrove
Hillsvale
Hopewell
Hubbards

I
Indian Harbour Lake
Indian Point
Ingomar
Ingonish
Ingonish Beach
Inverness
Ireton
Irishvale
Island View

J
Joggins
Jordantown
Judique

K
Kempt Shore
Kelley's Cove
Ketch Harbour
Kingsburg
Kingsport

L
L'Ardoise
Lake Annis
Lake Echo
Lake George (Yarmouth County)
Larry's River
Lawrencetown (Halifax County)
Lime Hill
Little Brook
Little River Harbour
Liverpool
Lochaber Mines
Londonderry
Louisbourg (also spelled Louisburg)
Louisdale
Lower Argyle
Lower Burlington
Lower Clarks Harbour
Lower East Pubnico
Lower Eel Brook
Lower Sackville
Lower Shag Harbour
Lower Wedgeport
Lower West Pubnico
Lower Woods Harbour
Lucasville
Lyons Brook

M
Mabou
Maccan
Mader's Cove
Marion Bridge
Maitland
Malay Falls
Marinette
Martinique
McNutts Island
Meat Cove
Medford
Melbourne
Melrose
Meteghan
Meteghan River
Middle Cape
Middle La Have
Middle Musquodoboit
Milford Station
Middle West Pubnico
Middle LaHave
Milton
Miramichi
Moosehead
Mooseland
Moose River Gold Mines
Mount Denson
Mount Hanley
Mount Uniacke
Mushaboom
Musquodoboit Harbour

N
Necum Teuch
New Canada
New Cumberland
New Germany
New Grafton
New Ross
New Waterford
Newcombville
Newellton
Newport Corner
Newport Station
Nictaux
Nineveh (Lunenburg County)
Nineveh (Victoria County)
Noel
North Alton
North East Harbour
North East Point
North Kemptville
North Medford
North Preston
Northside East Bay
North Sydney
North West Harbour
Norwood
Nyanza

O
Oak Park
Oakland
Ohio
Oregon
Overton

P
Paradise
Passchendaele
Petite Rivière
Pembroke
Pembroke (Yarmouth County)
Pinehurst
Pinkney's Point
Pleasant Bay
Pockwock
Popes Harbour
Port Bickerton
Portage
Portuguese Cove
Porters Lake
Port Clyde
Port Hastings
Port Hood
Port La Tour
Port Maitland
Port Medway
Port Morien
Port Saxon
Port Williams
Priestville
Pubnico

R
Raynardton
Rawdon
Renfrew
Reynoldscroft
River Bourgeois
River John
Riverport
Riverhead
Robert's Island
Rockingham
Rockville
Rocky Bay
Rose Bay
Roseway
Round Bay

S
Sambro
Sambro Creek
Sambro Head
Sand Beach
Sandford
Sandy Cove (Digby)
Sandy Cove (Halifax)
Sandy Cove (Queens)
Saulnierville
Scotch Village
Seal Island
Selma
Sheet Harbour
Sheet Harbour 36
Sheet Harbour Road
Sherbrooke
Sherose Island
Shinimicas Bridge
Ship Harbour
Short Beach
Shubenacadie
Smithsville
Smithville
Sonora
South Belleville
South Berwick
South Canaan
South Rawdon
South Side
Springfield
Springhaven
Springhill
Spryfield
Spry Harbour
Spry Bay
St. Andrew's Channel
St Croix
Steam Mill
Stewiacke
Stoney Island
Summerville
Summerville (Yarmouth County)
Sydney Mines
Sydney
Sydney Forks
Sydney River

T
Tennycape
Terra Nova
Thomasville
Three Mile Plains
Thorburn
Trafalgar
Tremont
Troy
Truro
Tusket
Tusket Falls
Tusket Islands

U
Upper Burlington
Upper Musquodoboit
Upper Port La Tour
Upper Stewiacke
Upper West Pubnico
Upper Woods Harbour

V
Valley
Victoria
Villagedale

W
Walden
Walton
Waterloo
Waterville
Waverley
Wedgeport
West Arichat
West Baccaro
West Berlin
West Branch River John
West Chezzetcook, Nova Scotia
West Pennant
West Pubnico
Western Shore
Weston
Weymouth
Whitehill
Whycocomagh
Williamswood
Wine Harbour
Wolfville
Woodstock
Woodville (Kings County)
Woodville (Hants County)

Y
Yankeetown
Yoho

See also

Demographics of Nova Scotia
Geography of Nova Scotia
List of counties of Nova Scotia

List of municipalities in Nova Scotia
List of towns in Nova Scotia
List of villages in Nova Scotia
List of Indian reserves in Nova Scotia

Notes

References

External links 
Map of Nova Scotia Municipalities